Gorna Breznitsa is a village in Kresna Municipality, in Blagoevgrad Province, Bulgaria.

References

External links 
 Website of Gorna Breznitsa

Villages in Blagoevgrad Province